Slovo House is a 2017 Ukrainian documentary film directed by Taras Tomenko and written by Lyuba Yakimchuk. The Ukrainian premiere of the film took place on October 27, 2017, in Kharkiv. The film participated in the official competition program of the 33rd Warsaw International Film Festival in 2017.

In 2018, the film won the Ukrainian National Film Award "Golden Dzyga" in the category "Best Documentary."

Plot 
In the late 1920s, a house was built in Kharkiv, then the capital of the Ukrainian Soviet Socialist Republic, according to Stalin, especially for Ukrainian writers and other cultural figures of the USSR. It was designed by Kharkiv city architect Mykhailo Dashkevych. Everything was provided there for the convenience of residents - spacious bright rooms, high ceilings, large windows. They even built a park nearby so that those who lived there would have a place to relax. Sixty-four comfortable apartments, a dining room, a solarium, staff - a real paradise for writers. Dozens of genius Ukrainian writers, poets, artists, screenwriters and actors were then relocated to this new building or writer's house. Mykola Khvylovy, Ostap Vyshnya, Mykhaylo Semenko, Anatol Petrytsky, Antin Dyky and others moved under one roof.

However, this paradise was equipped with a special surveillance system and a network of agents, thanks to which the authors were kept under control by the Soviet secret services. In particular, some writers were reported by their own wives, agents, and some by maids. All who visited this house were also under this control, among them - Bertolt Brecht, Theodore Dreiser, Bruno Jasieński, who came to Kharkiv for the International Conference of Revolutionary Writers in 1930. Ukrainian writers witnessed the effects of the Holodomor of 1932–33, and as a result their situation worsened.

Some writers committed suicide, some went insane. During the Stalinist repressions, residents of forty apartments out of sixty-three were arrested. The building was called Slovo, because the building itself was shaped like the cyrillic letter "C" (pronounced "S" in English). But for several years this house was called "Crematorium" or "house of pre-trial detention."

See also 

Slovo Building
Executed Renaissance

References

External links 
 Slovo House (2017) - IMDb

2017 films
2017 documentary films
Ukrainian-language films
2010s Russian-language films
Buildings and structures destroyed during the 2022 Russian invasion of Ukraine